DWRS (927 AM) Commando Radio is a radio station owned and operated by Solidnorth Broadcasting System. The station's studio and transmitter are located in SBS Bldg., Quirino Blvvd., Brgy. Tamag, Vigan.

References

News and talk radio stations in the Philippines
Radio stations in Ilocos Sur
Radio stations established in 1979